Cross-country skiing at the 1998 Winter Paralympics consisted of 39 events, 24 for men and 15 for women.

For the first and only time the classification Intellectual disability (ID) was included in cross-country skiing events at the Paralympic Games.

Medal table

Medal summary 
The competition events were:
2.5 km: - women
5 km: men - women
10 km: men - women
15 km: men
20 km: men
3x2.5 km relay: men - women
4x5 km relay: men

Each event had separate standing, sitting, or visually impaired classifications:

LW2 - standing: single leg amputation above the knee
LW3 - standing: double leg amputation below the knee, mild cerebral palsy, or equivalent impairment
LW4 - standing: single leg amputation below the knee
LW5/7 - standing: double arm amputation
LW6/8 - standing: single arm amputation
LW9 - standing: amputation or equivalent impairment of one arm and one leg
LW 10 - sitting: paraplegia with no or some upper abdominal function and no functional sitting balance
LW 11 - sitting: paraplegia with fair functional sitting balance
LW 12 - sitting: double leg amputation above the knees, or paraplegia with some leg function and good sitting balance
B1 - visually impaired: no functional vision
B2 - visually impaired: up to ca 3-5% functional vision
B3 - visually impaired: under 10% functional vision
ID - intellectual disability

Men's events

Women's events

See also
Cross-country skiing at the 1998 Winter Olympics

References 

 
 Winter Sport Classification, Canadian Paralympic Committee
 Historical Results - Results by Event - PWG Nagano 1998 - Long Distance, Official site of SaltLake2002
 Historical Results - Results by Event - PWG Nagano 1998 - Short Distance, Official site of SaltLake2002

1998 Winter Paralympics events
1998
Paralympics